The Ume River (Swedish: Ume älv or Umeälven) is one of the main rivers in northern Sweden. For large parts, the European route E12, also known as Blå Vägen (Blue Route), follows its path.

It passes through Vindelfjällen Nature Reserve and Lake Storuman and drains into the Gulf of Bothnia on Sweden's east coast at the small town of Holmsund, and adjacent to the city of Umeå. Its chief tributary is the Vindel River.

History
In the 1950s, hydroelectricity developments were building reservoirs and dams throughout the country (see also: energy in Sweden), but concerns were being raised against the environmental impact of these power plants. In particular, there were heated discussions about the developments on the Ume River and Vindel River. This led in 1961 an agreement called the Peace of Sarek, which prevented development on some rivers of the Vindel River and in exchange gave freedom to develop the other rivers, including the Ume River. The Ume River has since been extensively cultivated for hydroelectric power.

Timber industry

Development of the river around Baggböle started with the arrival of Scottish immigrants James and Robert Dickson in the 1830s. They had built their timber business in the Värmland province but in the 1820s they constructed two large water-powered sawmills. The sawmill at Baggböle was the largest in Sweden that was powered by water. So infamous were their methods that a new word in Swedish was derived from the name of "Baggböle". The Swedish word baggböleri is a pejorative term for reckless deforestation. The sawmills worked from May to October each year employing 170 workers.

The River Ume water-powered sawmill was under threat when steam power was introduced further south at Tunadal in Sweden in 1849. Twenty more steam-powered Swedish saw mills were started within a decade. These sawmills were usually placed near ports, and the former saw mills which had been positioned near water power were closed. The water-powered saw mill on the River Ume was one of the last to close in 1884 when Holmsund was given a steam-powered mill.

In 1914 a power plant was built where the sawmill was. This facility was eventually sold to the city of Umeå in 1947. Today the land used by Baggböle sawmill is Arboretum Norr.

Places named after Ume River 

In Schiedam in the Netherlands, Swedish-like houses are built and one of the streets, the Umefors, is named after this river.

See also 
Some of the other large rivers in northern Sweden:
 Kalix River
 Torne River
 Lule River
 Pite River
 Skellefte River
 Ångerman River

References

External links

Ume River

Rivers of Västerbotten County
Umeå
Drainage basins of the Baltic Sea